Downtown Sanford Historic District is a national historic district located at Sanford, Lee County, North Carolina. It encompasses 53 contributing buildings in the central business district of Sanford.  The district includes notable examples of Colonial Revival, Tudor Revival and Art Deco style architecture, with buildings largely dated between about 1895 to 1930.  Located in the district are the separately listed Railroad House and Temple Theatre.  Other notable buildings include the Sanford Buggy Company (c. 1908), McCracken Building (c. 1910), Passenger Depot (c. 1900), City Hall (c. 1909), Coca-Cola Bottling Company (c. 1908), Masonic Lodge (c. 1924), Makepeace Building (1924), Wilrick Hotel (1925), Bowers Building (c. 1925), Cole Pontiac Building (c. 1925), Hubbards Shoe Store (1926), Carolina Hotel (1930), and former U. S. Post Office (c. 1935).

It was listed on the National Register of Historic Places in 1985, with a boundary change in 2021.

References

Historic districts on the National Register of Historic Places in North Carolina
Colonial Revival architecture in North Carolina
Tudor Revival architecture in North Carolina
Art Deco architecture in North Carolina
Buildings and structures in Lee County, North Carolina
National Register of Historic Places in Lee County, North Carolina